is a passenger railway station in located in the city of Kadoma, Osaka Prefecture, Japan, operated by the private railway company Keihan Electric Railway.

Lines
Ōwada Station is served by the  Keihan Main Line, and is located 12.0 km from the starting point of the line at Yodoyabashi Station.

Station layout
The station has two elevated side side platforms, with the station building underneath.

Platforms

Adjacent stations

History
The station was opened on October 4, 1932

Passenger statistics
In fiscal 2019, the station was used by an average of 22,252 passengers daily (boarding passengers only).

Surrounding area
Osaka International University Moriguchi Campus
 Osaka International Owada Junior and Senior High School

References

External links

Official home page 

Railway stations in Japan opened in 1932
Railway stations in Osaka Prefecture
Kadoma, Osaka